The Teahouse is a 1974 Hong Kong crime drama directed by Kuei Chih-Hung. Written by On Szeto, the film is about an immigrant restaurant owner trying to protect his family from juvenile gangs. It was such a hit that the film was followed by a 1975 sequel, Big Brother Cheng, with kung fu star Chen Kuan Tai reprising the eponymous role.

Cast

Chen Kuan Tai as Wang 'Big Brother' Cheng
Karen Yeh as Mrs. Wang
Wu Chi Liu as Hsien Chu
Lin Tung as Police Officer
Huang Chien-Lung as Hsi Tieng
Feng Lin as Tan Yen-yung
Yang Chih Ching as Fa-Dat Tso
Shen Chan as Sheng Fan-ming
Yang Chiang as Shui Niu-chia
Peng Fei-Li as Chui Dai-fu
Ping Ha as Auntie Tan
Keng Chang as Prosecuting Judge

External links
 

1974 films
Hong Kong crime drama films
1974 crime drama films
Shaw Brothers Studio films
1970s Hong Kong films